Paprotki  is a village in the administrative district of Gmina Lubawka, within Kamienna Góra County, Lower Silesian Voivodeship, in south-western Poland.

Prior to 1945 the village was a part of Germany.

References

Villages in Kamienna Góra County